Philip Bernard Rynard (25 June 1897 – 20 November 1980) was a Canadian physician, surgeon, and politician.

Born in Udora, Ontario, he received his medical education at Queen's University. He was a Medical Health Officer for the province of Ontario and practiced medicine in Orillia.

He first ran unsuccessfully for the House of Commons of Canada in the 1953 federal election for the riding of Simcoe East. A Progressive Conservative, he was elected in the 1957 election. He was re-elected in 1958, 1962, 1963, 1965, 1968, 1972, and 1974. He was the physician to Prime Minister John Diefenbaker.

Rynard suffered a stroke in February 1980. He died in Orillia that November.

Archives
There is a Philip Bernard Rynard fonds at Library and Archives Canada. Archival reference number is R3303.

References

External links
 

1897 births
1980 deaths
Physicians from Ontario
Members of the House of Commons of Canada from Ontario
People from Orillia
Progressive Conservative Party of Canada MPs
Queen's University at Kingston alumni